Bolagh Mahalleh (also Romanized as Bolāgh Maḩalleh; also known as Bodāgh Maḩalleh, Būdāgh Maḩalleh, Budag Mahalleh, Budag-Makhallekh, and Būdāk Maḩalleh) is a village in Gil Dulab Rural District, in the Central District of Rezvanshahr County, Gilan Province, Iran. At the 2006 census, its population was 345, in 90 families.

References 

Populated places in Rezvanshahr County